José Alberto Castañeda Pérez (born 3 September 1949) is a Mexican politician affiliated with the National Action Party. As of 2014 he served as Senator of the LVIII and LIX Legislatures of the Mexican Congress representing Yucatán and as Deputy of the LVII Legislature.

References

1949 births
Living people
Politicians from Monterrey
Members of the Senate of the Republic (Mexico)
Members of the Chamber of Deputies (Mexico)
National Action Party (Mexico) politicians
20th-century Mexican politicians
21st-century Mexican politicians
Universidad Iberoamericana alumni